Iowa City, officially the City of Iowa City, is a city in Johnson County, Iowa, United States. It is the home of the University of Iowa and county seat of Johnson County, at the center of the Iowa City Metropolitan Statistical Area. At the time of the 2020 census the population was 74,828, making it the state's fifth-largest city. The metropolitan area, which encompasses Johnson and Washington counties, has a population of over 171,000.  The Iowa City Metropolitan Statistical Area (MSA) is also a part of a Combined Statistical Area (CSA) with the Cedar Rapids MSA. This CSA plus two additional counties are known as the Iowa City-Cedar Rapids region which collectively has a population of nearly 500,000.

Iowa City was the second capital of the Iowa Territory and the first capital city of the State of Iowa. The Old Capitol building is a National Historic Landmark in the center of the University of Iowa campus. The University of Iowa Art Museum and Plum Grove, the home of the first Governor of Iowa, are also tourist attractions. In 2008, Forbes magazine named Iowa City the second-best small metropolitan area for doing business in the United States.

History 
Iowa City was created by an act of Legislative Assembly of the Iowa Territory on January 21, 1839, fulfilling the desire of Governor Robert Lucas to move the capital out of Burlington and closer to the center of the territory. This act began:

An Act to locate the Seat of Government of the Territory of Iowa ... so soon as the place shall be selected, and the consent of the United States obtained, the commissioners shall proceed to lay out a town to be called "Iowa City".

Commissioners Chauncey Swan and John Ronalds met on May 1 in the small settlement of Napoleon, south of present-day Iowa City, to select a site for the new capital city. The following day the commissioners selected a site on bluffs above the Iowa River north of Napoleon, placed a stake in the center of the proposed site and began planning the new capital city. Commissioner Swan, in a report to the legislature in Burlington, described the site:

Iowa City is located on a section of land laying in the form of an amphitheater. There is an eminence on the west near the river, running parallel with it." 

By June of that year, the town had been platted and surveyed from Brown St. in the north to Burlington St. in the south, and from the Iowa River eastward to Governor St.

While Iowa City was selected as the territorial capital in 1839, it did not officially become the capital city until 1841; after construction on the capitol building had begun. The capitol building was completed in 1842, and the last four territorial legislatures and the first six Iowa General Assemblies met there until 1857, when the state capital was moved to Des Moines.

Iowa Old Capitol Building

John F. Rague is credited with designing the Territorial Capitol Building. He had previously designed the 1837 capitol of Illinois and was supervising its construction when he got the commission to design the new Iowa capitol in 1839. He quit the Iowa project after five months, claiming his design was not followed, but the resemblance to the Illinois capitol suggests he strongly influenced the final Iowa design. One surviving 1839 sketch of the proposed capital shows a radically different layout, with two domes and a central tower. The cornerstone of the Old Capitol Building was laid in Iowa City on July 4, 1840. Iowa City served as the third and last territorial capital of Iowa, and the last four territorial legislatures met at the Old Capitol Building until December 28, 1846, when Iowa was admitted into the United States as the 29th state of the union. Iowa City was declared the state capital of Iowa, and the government convened in the Old Capitol Building.

1843 cemetery
Oakland Cemetery was deeded to "the people of Iowa City" by the Iowa territorial legislature on February 13, 1843. The original plot was one block square, with the southwest corner at Governor and Church. Over the years the cemetery has been expanded and now encompasses 40 acres. Oakland Cemetery is a non-perpetual care city cemetery. This cemetery is supported by city taxes. The staff is strongly committed to the maintenance and preservation of privately owned lots and accessories. Since its establishment, the cemetery has become the final resting place of many men and women important in the history of Iowa, of Iowa City and the University of Iowa. These include Robert E. Lucas, first governor of the territory (1838–41); Samuel J. Kirkwood, governor during the Civil War (1860–64), again in 1876, a U.S. senator in 1877, and subsequently secretary of the interior and U.S. minister to Spain; well-known presidents of the university, Walter A. Jessup (1915–33) and Virgil M. Hancher (1940–64); Cordelia Swan, daughter of one of the three commissioners who selected the site for Iowa City and the new territorial capitol; and Irving B. Weber (1900–1997), noted Iowa City historian. It is also home to the legendary monument called the "Black Angel", which is an 8.5-foot tall monument for the Feldevert family erected in 1912. The facts behind the Black Angel long ago gave way to myths, superstitions and legend surrounding its mysterious change in color from a golden bronze cast to an eerie black.

1847 University founding
Founded in 1847, today's University of Iowa offers more than 100 areas of study to 31,112 students.  The university includes a medical school and one of the United States' largest university-owned teaching hospitals, providing patient care within 16 medical specialties. Iowa City is also the location of Mercy Hospital. The University of Iowa College of Law is located there.

1970 riots
The spring of 1970 was a tumultuous time on college campuses. On April 30, President Richard Nixon announced that U.S. forces would invade Cambodia because of the recent communist coup. Students around the country protested this escalation of the Vietnam War. On May 4, the National Guard fired on students at Kent State University, killing four and wounding nine people, which ignited protests all over the country.

Anti-war protests were not new to Iowa City or to elsewhere in Iowa; protests had been occurring throughout the 1960s. Spring of 1970 was different.

After the Kent State shootings, students marched on the National Guard Armory, broke windows there as well as in some downtown businesses. The City Council gave the mayor curfew powers. On May 6, there was a student boycott of classes. That night, about 400 people had a "sleep-in" in front of the Old Capitol.  That night also, about 50 people broke into the Old Capitol and set off a smoke bomb. The protesters left voluntarily when asked to do so. Around 2 am Friday morning, President Boyd requested arrest of the students on the Pentacrest by highway patrolmen, but the next day he regretted the mass arrests and said he had received faulty information. On May 8, President Boyd cancelled the 89th annual Governor's day ROTC observance for the following day. On Friday and Saturday a National Guard helicopter circled the Pentacrest.

In the early morning hours of Saturday, May 9, the Old Armory Temporary (O.A.T.), also known as "Big Pink", which housed the writing lab, was burned down. This building was located next to the Old Armory, where the Adler Journalism and Mass Communications building currently is located. O.A.T was said to be at the top of a list of buildings for burning, probably due to its poor condition and was considered a firetrap.

The Iowa Alumni Review includes an article about the fire in which the author states: "Only the ends stayed upright. ... On the south, Lou Kelly's Writing lab bearing the sign 'another mother for peace,' escaped." There was a second, smaller fire on Saturday evening in a restroom in the East Hall Annex.

By Sunday morning, President Boyd gave students the option to leave. Classes were not cancelled but students could leave and take the grade they currently had. An account of the May 1970 protests can be read in the June–July issue of the Iowa Alumni Review.

In his autobiography, My Iowa Journey: The Life Story of the University of Iowa's First African American Professor, Philip Hubbard (University Vice-Provost in 1970) gives an administrator's perspective of all the protests of the 1960s.  He supported the students' right to protest and in 1966 stated:
"Students should not accept everything that is dished out to them. We don't want to dictate what they should or should not do. However, student demonstrations should remain within the law and good taste without interfering with the university's primary purpose of instructing students."

During this time, there was also a strong ROTC presence on campus. Their presence on campus and the academic credit they received for their service was called into question by both students and faculty in the spring of 1970, but Boyd said he could not abolish ROTC. The Alumni Review had an article called "ROTC: Alive and well at Iowa" in the December 1969 issue which helps provide a more complete picture of this period in history.

2006 tornadoes 

On the evening of April 13, 2006, a confirmed EF2 tornado struck Iowa City, causing severe property damage and displacing many from their homes, including many University of Iowa students. It was the first tornado ever recorded to hit the city directly. No serious injuries were reported in the Iowa City area.

A popular Dairy Queen, which had been in business for 54 years, was a victim of the storm (but it reopened in late September), along with two large car dealerships, and several other businesses along Riverside Drive and Iowa Highway 1. The 134-year-old Saint Patrick's Catholic Church was heavily damaged only minutes after Holy Thursday Mass, with most of its roof destroyed. The building was ruled a total loss and has since been demolished. The downtown business district as well as the eastern residential area and several parks suffered scattered damage of varying degrees.

Additionally, several houses in the sorority row area were destroyed. The Alpha Chi Omega house was nearly destroyed, though no one was injured. The building was later razed. Cleanup efforts were under way almost immediately as local law enforcement, volunteer workers from all over the state, and Iowa City residents and college students worked together to restore the city. The total cost of damage was estimated at $12 million–$4 million of which was attributed to Iowa City and Johnson County property.

2008 flood 

A local newspaper reported on June 11, 2008, that water exceeded the emergency spillway at the Coralville Reservoir outside of Iowa City. As a result, the City of Iowa City and the University of Iowa were seriously affected by unprecedented flooding of the Iowa River, which caused widespread property damage and forced evacuations in large sections of the city. Much of the city's 500-year floodplain saw mild to catastrophic effects of the rapidly flowing, polluted water. Officials at the University of Iowa reported that up to 19 buildings were affected by rising waters. Extensive efforts to move materials from the university's main library were undertaken as large groups of sandbagging volunteers began to construct a massive levee near the building. Approximately $300 million worth of art, including work by Picasso, owned by the university was secretly moved to a holding place in the Chicago area before the fine arts area was heavily hit with flood water.

On Friday, June 13, university employees were encouraged to stay home, and travel was strongly discouraged in Iowa City; one city statement advised, "If you live in east Iowa City, stay in east Iowa City; if you live in west Iowa City, stay in west Iowa City." The Burlington St. bridge was the only bridge that remained open, other than the I-80 bridge on the edge of town, to connect the east and west sides of the Iowa River. On Saturday, June 14, officials at the University of Iowa began to power down the university's primary power generating plant along the Iowa River to prevent structural damage. Backup units continued to provide necessary power and steam services for essential University services, including the University of Iowa Hospitals and Clinics. Water began touching the bottom of the Park St. bridge forcing the Army Corps of Engineers to drill several holes in the bridge to allow air trapped underneath to escape. Also on Saturday, Mayor Regenia Bailey issued a curfew restricting anyone except those authorized by law enforcement from being within  of any area affected by the flood between 8:30 pm and 6 am.

2010s and environmental issues
On October 4, 2019, a Friday climate school strike with Greta Thunberg was held in Iowa City, where school youths protested against coal power.

Geography and climate 

The elevation at the Iowa City Municipal Airport is 668 ft (203.6 m) above sea level.

Iowa City has a humid continental climate, hot-summer subtype (Dfa in the Köppen climate classification). Average monthly precipitation is lowest in winter and peaks significantly from May to August, with June being the average wettest month. Showers and thunderstorms are common from May to September, and can be severe, especially from May to July. In winter, snowfall is moderate, occasionally heavy in single storms. Snow cover is occasional in drier and/or warmer winter seasons, but (rarely) can be continuous in the coldest seasons, such as that of 1978–79. The Iowa City area was struck by a severe hailstorm on May 18, 1997, and by tornadoes on April 13, 2006. Overall, Iowa City's tornado risk is lower than that of areas to the south and southwest, such as Oklahoma, Kansas and Missouri.

Demographics 

Iowa City is commonly known as a college town. It is home to the University of Iowa and a small campus of Kirkwood Community College. The population increases during the months when the two schools are in session.

As of the 2010 census, about 58.0% of adults held a bachelor's degree or higher and 79.7% were white alone, not Hispanic or Latino, 6.2% were Asian alone, and 5.8% were black alone, while the median household income was $41,410, about $10,000 less than the state median.

2010 census 
As of the census of 2010, there were 67,862 people, 27,657 households, and 11,743 families residing in the city. The racial makeup of the city was 82.5% White, 5.8% African American, 0.2% Native American, 6.9% Asian, 2.1% from other races, and 2.5% from two or more races. Hispanic or Latino of any race were 5.3% of the population.

There were 27,657 households, of which 19.8% had children under the age of 18 living with them, 32.5% were married couples living together, 7.2% had a female householder with no husband present, 2.8% had a male householder with no wife present, and 57.5% were non-families. 34.3% of all households were made up of individuals, and 7% had someone living alone who was 65 years of age or older. The average household size was 2.22 and the average family size was 2.88.

The median age in the city was 25.6 years. 14.9% of residents were under the age of 18; 33.4% were between the ages of 18 and 24; 25.7% were from 25 to 44; 17.8% were from 45 to 64; and 8.2% were 65 years of age or older. The gender makeup of the city was 49.7% male and 50.3% female.

2000 census 
As of the census of 2000, there were 62,220 people, 25,202 households, and 11,189 families residing in the city. The racial makeup of the city was 87.33% White, 3.75% African American, 0.31% American Indian, 5.64% Asian, 0.04% Pacific Islander, 1.25% from other races, and 1.68% from two or more races. Hispanic or Latino of any race were 2.95% of the population.

There were 25,202 households, out of which 21.2% had children under the age of 18 living with them, 35.2% were married couples living together, 2% were households with same-sex couples (2000 U.S. Census), 3.7% had a female householder with no husband present, and 55.6% were non-families. 33.8% of all households were made up of individuals, and 6.1% had someone living alone who was 65 years of age or older. The average household size was 2.23 and the average family size was 2.90.

Age spread: 16.2% under the age of 18, 32.8% from 18 to 24, 28.1% from 25 to 44, 15.9% from 45 to 64, and 7.0% who were 65 years of age or older. The median age was 25 years. For every 100 females, there were 96.2 males. For every 100 females age 18 and over, there were 94.3 males.

The median income for a household in the city was $34,977, and the median income for a family was $57,568. Males had a median income of $35,435 versus $28,981 for females. The per capita income for the city was $20,269. About 2.7% of families and 4.7% of the population were below the poverty line, including 10.2% of those under age 18 and 3.0% of those age 65 or over.

Metropolitan area 
The Iowa City Metropolitan Statistical Area consists of Johnson and Washington counties in Iowa; Washington County was added to the MSA after the 2000 census. It had a 2000 census population of 131,676, and a 2010 population of 152,586.

Iowa City is contiguous with Coralville to the northwest. University Heights is completely contained within the boundaries of Iowa City, near Kinnick Stadium. Tiffin, North Liberty, Solon, and Hills are other towns within a few miles.

The Iowa City MSA and the nearby Cedar Rapids MSA are collectively a Combined Statistical Area (CSA). This CSA along with two additional counties are known as the Iowa City-Cedar Rapids (ICR) Corridor and collectively have a population of over 450,000.

Economy 
Iowa City is home to the University of Iowa Hospitals and Clinics (UIHC), the state's only comprehensive tertiary care medical center. The Holden Comprehensive Cancer Center in Iowa City is an NCI-designated Cancer Center, one of fewer than 60 in the country.

ACT college testing services is headquartered in Iowa City.

In 2004, Forbes magazine named Iowa City the third Best Small Metropolitan Area in the United States.

In June 2006, Kiplinger's Personal Finance rated Iowa City No. 10 on its list of the Top 50 Smart Places to Live.

Top employers 
According to Iowa City's 2018 Comprehensive Annual Financial Report, the top employers in the city are:

Arts and culture 

In the early 1970s, the Old Capitol was renovated and university administrative offices were relocated to Jessup Hall. All but one of the major rooms were restored to their appearance when Iowa City was the state capital. In November 2001 the cupola caught fire during the renovation of its gold leaf dome. The cupola was destroyed and the building was heavily damaged. In 2006, after an extensive restoration, the building re-opened to the public. The building now serves as the Old Capitol Museum, as well as a venue for speeches, lectures, press conferences and performances in the original state senate chamber.

The Iowa Avenue Literary Walk, a series of bronze relief panels that feature authors' words as well as attribution, is a tribute to the city's rich literary history. The panels are visually connected by a series of general quotations about books and writing stamped into the concrete sidewalk. All 49 authors and playwrights featured in the Literary Walk have ties to Iowa.

In November 2008, UNESCO designated Iowa City as the world's third City of Literature, making it a part of the UNESCO Creative Cities Network. It was the only American city to receive the honor, until Seattle, Washington was designated a City of Literature in 2017.

In 2004, the Old Capitol Cultural District was one of the first Cultural Districts certified by the State of Iowa. The district extends from the University of Iowa Pentacrest, south to the Johnson County Courthouse, east to College Green Park, and north into the historic Northside Neighborhood.

Cultural events 
Iowa City has a variety of cultural events.  It has a strong literary history and is the home of the Iowa Writers' Workshop, whose graduates include John Irving, Flannery O'Connor, T.C. Boyle, and many other prominent U.S. authors; the nation's leading Non-Fiction Writing Program; the Iowa Playwrights' Workshop; the Iowa Summer Writing Festival; and the International Writing Program, a unique residency program that has hosted writers from more than 120 countries.

Iowa City also sponsors a variety of events in the Summer of the Arts program.  These include a nationally renowned Iowa City Jazz Festival, Iowa Arts Festival, open-air summer movies series called Saturday Night Free Movie Series and free concerts every Friday night in the pedestrian mall called the Friday Night Concert Series (Ped Mall).

The Iowa City Book Festival began as an annual summer event in 2009 sponsored by the University of Iowa Libraries and in 2013 it was moved to October when management was handed off to the Iowa City UNESCO City of Literature.  It features readings from prominent authors and literature themed events.

The Iowa Biennial Exhibition [TIBE] began in 2004 as an international survey of contemporary miniature printmaking held its initial exhibition at the University of Iowa. The 2006 exhibition, received a 2007 "ICKY" award nomination in Visual Arts Programming from the Iowa Cultural Corridor Alliance for its exhibition at the University of Iowa's Project Art Gallery.

Downtown Iowa City arts venues include the historic Englert Theatre, a live music and performing arts center; Riverside Theatre, a professional theatre company with an annual season that includes an outdoor Shakespeare festival; and FilmScene, a non-profit film organization and art house movie theater with two locations and five screens plus a seasonal outdoor cinema.

The Englert Theatre produces Mission Creek Festival each spring, focusing on community events, performance and literary programming featuring over 100 writers each year. Witching Hour takes place each fall and focuses on exploring the unknown, discussing the creative process and presenting new work.

Local landmarks 

 Hancher Auditorium often hosts nationally touring theater, dance and musical shows, and has commissioned more than 100 works of music, theater and dance during the last 20 years. This facility was badly damaged during the Iowa flood of 2008 and the facility has been rebuilt farther uphill, away from the Iowa River and reopened in Fall of 2016.
 Hamburg Inn No. 2 is a favorite campaign stop for political candidates. It was featured in a 2005 episode of the political drama The West Wing. It has also been a favored campaign stop for many U.S. Presidents, including Bill Clinton and Ronald Reagan. It was featured in The New York Times for its widely renowned "pie shakes".
 Oakland Cemetery contains graves of notable locals as well as the "Black Angel" statue.
 Plum Grove Historic House was the residence of Robert Lucas, the first territorial governor of Iowa, and the novelist Eleanor Hoyt Brainerd.
 Moffitt cottages, built in a unique vernacular architectural style, are scattered around eastern Iowa City. "These mystical dwellings look as if Germanic elves constructed houses for Irish pixies," is how one writer described them.
 Prospect Hill
 Ned Ashton House, built as a private residence by Iowa bridge engineer Ned Ashton in 1947, was placed on the National Register of Historic Places in 2001. Today, it is a popular venue that can accommodate up to 100 people for meetings, reunions, parties, weddings and receptions along the banks of the Iowa River.

Pedestrian Mall 

City Plaza (commonly called the Pedestrian Mall or simply Ped Mall) serves as a gathering place for students and locals and draws large crowds for its summertime events such as the Friday Night Concert Series and the annual Iowa City Jazz Festival and Iowa City Arts Festival. The Ped Mall area contains restaurants, bars, retail, hotels, and the Iowa City Public Library.  It is known for its appeal to various local artists and musicians, and its wild bar scene. The Coldren Opera House was located on the street which has now become the mall.

Education 
The Iowa City Community School District operates public schools in Iowa City. Iowa City High School, Iowa City West High School, Liberty High School are the three public high schools. Iowa City is also home to the private PK-12 school district, Regina Catholic Education Center. Iowa City is home to The University of Iowa and a branch of Kirkwood Community College.

The Iowa City Japanese School (アイオワシティ補習授業校 Aiowa Shiti Hoshū Jugyō Kō), a weekend educational program for Japanese nationals, provides Japanese language instruction, holding its classes at Zion Lutheran Church.

Sports 

Iowa City is home of the University of Iowa's athletic teams, known as the Iowa Hawkeyes. A member of the Big Ten Conference, the football team plays at Kinnick Stadium, while men's and women's basketball, volleyball, and the wrestling and gymnastics teams compete at Carver-Hawkeye Arena. The Hawkeyes football team regularly sends players to the NFL, including Super Bowl Champion all-pro Baltimore Ravens guard Marshall Yanda, 2004 2nd overall draft pick Robert Gallery, and San Francisco 49ers tight end George Kittle, among many others. Kirk Ferentz is the longest tenured head coach in NCAA FBS dating back to the 1999–2000 season.

Iowa City's three public high schools, City, West, and Liberty, are members of the Mississippi Valley Conference. Regina competes in the River Valley Conference.

The Iowa City Gold Sox were a semi-professional baseball team that called Iowa City home from 1912 through 1913.

Parks and recreation 
Iowa City is home to many public spaces. Most of the facilities are operated by the City of Iowa City Parks & Recreation Department, while some are owned by the University of Iowa, and others held by private entities such as the Bur Oak Land Trust.

Some of the more significant parks include Waterworks Prairie Park which is a naturalized sand pit and the largest park in the city at 231 acres. City Park contains the Bobby Oldis Fields, an outdoor pool complex, many picnic areas and playgrounds, as well as the Riverside Festival Stage. Hickory Hill Park is a large wooded park on the north side of town. Hubbard Park is a green space directly south of the Iowa Memorial Union building and used for many campus events.

There are three golf courses within city limits. Finkbine Golf Course is an 18-hole course owned by the University of Iowa. Pleasant Valley Golf Course is a public 18 hole course located south along the Iowa River. Elks Lodge Country Club is a private 9 hole course located near the Peninsula Neighborhood.

The Iowa City Kickers Soccer Complex can hold more than 17 soccer fields depending on layout and is home of the Iowa City Kickers soccer club. Napoleon park is located along the Iowa River and has 8 baseball diamonds. Bobby Oldis Fields are located within City Park and has 8 baseball diamonds. Hawkeye Recreation Fields is in the University of Iowa and contains to 12 soccer fields, 4 beach volleyball pitches, and 4 basketball courts. Bill and Jim Ashton Cross Country Course is one of the few dedicated cross country courses in the country. The University of Iowa also operates the Fieldhouse, Campus Recreation & Wellness Center, and Hawkeye Tennis & Recreation Complex which contain fitness space as well as indoor sports pitches and pools.

Iowa City has many miles of cycling trails. There are dedicated trails along the Iowa River, Clear Creek, Willow Creek, and Ralston Creek. The Iowa City trail system connects to the northwest to Coralville, Tiffin, and North Liberty's trail systems.

Government 
Iowa City is governed by an elected city council of seven members: four council members at large and three district members. The two council members at large who receive the most votes and the three district council members serve four-year terms. The other two council members at large serve two-year terms. A mayor and mayor pro tem are elected by the council from within its members to serve terms of two years. , Iowa City Council members are:

 Bruce Teague, At-Large, Mayor
 Megan Alter, At-Large, Mayor Pro Tem
 Laura Bergus, At-Large
 Janice Weiner, At-Large
 Pauline Taylor, District A
 Shawn Harmsen, District B
 John Thomas, District C

Under this form of council-manager government the powers of the city are vested in the city council. The council is responsible for appointing the city manager ( Geoff Fruin) who implements the policy decisions of the city council, enforces city ordinances and appoints city officials. The council selects the mayor and appoints the city attorney and city clerk.

Iowa City is unusual in that it is one of only four cities in Iowa in which the mayor is chosen by the city council. The mayor of Iowa City serves a two-year term from amongst the members of the council. The mayor is primarily a figurehead or a "first among equals", with some power to set agendas and lead meetings, as well as serving as the public face of city government.

Media 

Three radio stations are based out of the University of Iowa. Two have become part of the statewide Iowa Public Radio network: WSUI 910 AM, a National Public Radio affiliate and originator of some Iowa Public Radio news and talk programming; and KSUI 91.7 FM, which broadcasts classical music and concerts by Iowa classical orchestras, opera companies, and other artists, as well as interviews. KCCK-FM is Iowa's only Jazz station and affiliated with Public Radio International. KRUI 89.7 FM is the university's student-run radio station.

iHeartMedia owns two of the Iowa City area's commercial radio stations: KXIC 800 AM, a news/talk station, and KKRQ 100.7 FM, a classic rock station. KCJJ 1630 AM is an independently owned, 10,000-watt station that broadcasts a mixture of talk radio and Hot AC music programming along with area high school football and basketball games and NASCAR racing. Another Iowa City-licensed station, KRNA 94.1 FM, now broadcasts from Cedar Rapids and is operated by Cumulus Media. Radio signals from other cities, including Cedar Rapids and the Quad Cities, also reach the Iowa City area.

Iowa City and Johnson County are part of the Cedar Rapids-Waterloo-Iowa City-Dubuque media market, which was ranked 87th by Nielsen Media Research for the 2007–2008 TV season. Two television stations, KIIN channel 12 (PBS) and KWKB channel 20 (Court TV Mystery), are licensed to Iowa City. KCRG-TV 9, the ABC affiliate in Cedar Rapids, maintains a news bureau at Old Capitol Mall in downtown Iowa City.

Mediacom, a local cable television franchisee, provides channel space for seven Public, educational, and government access (PEG) cable TV channels in Iowa City: City Channel 4, Infovision (channel 5), Kirkwood Television Services (channel 11), Public Access Television (channel 18), the Iowa City Public Library Channel (channel 20), and the Iowa City Community School District's channel 21.

Two daily newspapers are published in Iowa City. The Iowa City Press-Citizen, owned by Gannett, publishes six days a week with Gannett's Des Moines Sunday Register standing in as a Sunday edition. The Daily Iowan, an independent newspaper based at the University of Iowa, publishes Monday through Friday while classes are in session. In addition, The Gazette of Cedar Rapids maintains a news bureau in Iowa City.

Little Village is an independent alt-weekly magazine covering Iowa City and Cedar Rapids metropolitan areas.

Transportation 

Iowa City has a general aviation airport, the Iowa City Municipal Airport, on the south side of the city. The Eastern Iowa Airport,  to the northwest, serves Iowa City and Cedar Rapids with scheduled passenger flights.

Interstate 80 runs east–west along the north edge of Iowa City. U.S. Highway 218 and Iowa Highway 27 (the Avenue of the Saints) are co-signed along a freeway bypassing Iowa City to the west. U.S. Highway 6 and Iowa Highway 1 also run through Iowa City.

Iowa City is served by the freight-only Iowa Interstate Railroad and the Cedar Rapids and Iowa City Railway (CRANDIC). The historic Iowa City Depot, shown in the picture at left, is no longer in use for railway services; it has been modified into a commercial office building.

In 2009, the Iowa City metropolitan statistical area (MSA) ranked as the seventh highest (tied with Hinesville-Fort Stewart, Georgia MSA) in the United States for percentage of commuters who walked to work (8.2 percent). In 2013, the Iowa City MSA ranked as the sixth lowest in the United States for percentage of workers who commuted by private automobile (73.4 percent). During the same year, 11.1 percent of Iowa City area commuters walked to work.

Buses 

Iowa City Transit, Coralville Transit, and the University of Iowa's Cambus system provide public transportation.

Intercity bus transit is served at either the Court Street Transportation Center in Iowa City or the Coralville Transit Intermodal Facility in Coralville.

Cycling 
There is a system of paved bicycle paths, especially along the Iowa River.

Some of the main roads also have designated bike lanes or sharrows, such as Jefferson street, Market street, and College street. As of 2017, both Iowa City and the University of Iowa have been awarded 'silver' status as a bicycle friendly community and university, respectively, by the League of American Bicyclists.

Notable people

See also

 Iowa City Public Library
 University of Iowa Hospitals and Clinics
 University of Iowa
 Kirkwood Community College
 Coralville, Iowa
 Iowa City Community School District
 Iowa City Police Department
 Mormon handcart pioneers

References

External links
 

 City of Iowa City
 Iowa City/Coralville Convention and Visitors Bureau 
 Iowa City Area Chamber of Commerce
 Iowa City Public Library
 City Data Statistical Data and more about Iowa City, Iowa
 City of Literature Documentary produced by The University of Iowa

 
Cities in Iowa
County seats in Iowa
Former state capitals in the United States
Cities in Johnson County, Iowa
Iowa City metropolitan area
1839 establishments in Iowa Territory
Populated places established in 1839